Cheryl Marie Stanton is an American lawyer and former government official. She was the Administrator of the Wage and Hour Division at the United States Department of Labor under the Trump Administration. She previously served as the Executive Director of the South Carolina Department of Employment and Workforce.

Career 
Stanton is a graduate of Williams College, and earned her J.D. from the University of Chicago Law School, graduating in 1997. During this time she was a clerk for Samuel Alito on the United States Court of Appeals for the Third Circuit.

Early in her career, Stanton worked as a labor and employment attorney in both the public and private sectors. She served as associate White House counsel for President George W. Bush, acting as the administration's principal liaison to the U.S. Department of Labor, National Labor Relations Board, and the Equal Employment Opportunity Commission.

South Carolina Department of Employment and Workforce 
In 2013, Stanton was appointed as the Executive Director of the South Carolina Department of Employment and Workforce by governor Nikki Haley. While there, Stanton collaborated with the South Carolina Department of Commerce, the South Carolina Technical College System, and the South Carolina Department of Education to create the South Carolina Talent Pipeline project, which aims to create a consistent supply of qualified candidates for state jobs. She also partnered with the South Carolina Department of Corrections to establish the Second Chance program, which helps inmates who are preparing to be released from prison to search for work and secure jobs after incarceration.

In 2016, Nikki Haley awarded Stanton the Order of the Palmetto, which is the highest civilian honor awarded by the Governor of South Carolina.

On November 26, 2018, South Carolina governor Henry McMaster announced the resignation of Cheryl Stanton from her position at the Department of Employment and Workforce.

United States Department of Labor 
Stanton was confirmed by the Senate for the position of Administrator of the Wage and Hour Division for the United States Department of Labor on April 10, 2019.

References

Living people
21st-century American lawyers
South Carolina lawyers
Williams College alumni
University of Chicago Law School alumni
George W. Bush administration personnel
Trump administration personnel
Year of birth missing (living people)